"How Do You Sleep?" is the third single from Jesse McCartney's third studio album, Departure. The song was released on January 20, 2009. The song was written and produced by R&B singer Sean Garrett, and his production partner Clubba Langg.

Critical reception
"How Do You Sleep?" received favorable reviews. Billboard gave the song a positive review: "While his previous single 'It's Over' failed to achieve the same success as his No. 1 top 40 hit 'Leavin',' Jesse McCartney keeps the ball rolling with 'How Do You Sleep?' from his 2008 CD Departure. He croons about his lost love, 'It's been about a year now/ Ain't seen or heard from you/Been missing you crazy,' to a twangin' hip-hop beat co-penned and co-produced by R&B master Sean Garrett. R&B and rhythmic stations smart enough to embrace Justin Timberlake would be wise to indulge another white boy, who fuels the fire with remixes featuring Ludacris. McCartney has certainly grown up; now it's time that radio gave this talent his just deserts: sustained stardom." About.com stated, "The beats here give an insistent atmosphere that will make 'How Do You Sleep?' hard to forget and added that with raps from Ludacris adds a great muscular addition to the song."

Remix
An official remix featuring rapper Ludacris was made and sent to radio. This version is also the single version.

McCartney said the following about collaborating with Ludacris: "I've been a fan of Luda's throughout his career and having him on this track was an amazing honor. He's innovative across the board and always brings the freshest lyrics to any track."

There are currently two remixes made, A rhythmic version, which consists of a different instrumentation and a Top 40 version, which uses the original beat.

Promotion
McCartney performed “How Do You Sleep? (Remix)” with Ludacris for the first time on TV on The Ellen DeGeneres Show on April 16, 2009.

Music video
An official live performance promo video for the single was released on December 18, 2008. It is collected footage from McCartney on tour.

McCartney stated in an interview backstage at B96's Jingle Ball 2008, that the shooting of the official music video for the single started in January 2009. The official video premiered on McCartney's MySpace page on March 3, 2009.

Katy Perry makes a cameo in both videos. In the live video she is seen giving Jesse a hug backstage while in the remix video she only appears on a photograph in Jesse's car.

Track listing
 "How Do You Sleep?" [Radio Edit] – 3:18
 "How Do You Sleep?" [Album Version Radio Edit] – 3:22
 "How Do You Sleep?" [Album Version] – 3:43
 "How Do You Sleep?" [Main Version] – 3:32 (featuring Ludacris)
 "How Do You Sleep?" [Rhythmic Radio Mix] – 3:48 (featuring Ludacris)
 "How Do You Sleep?" [Rhythmic Radio Mix – No Rap] – 3:28
 "How Do You Sleep?" [Bonus Video]

Charts performance
The original version debuted at number 125 on the Bubbling Under Hot 100 Singles. The version with Ludacris debuted on the Billboard Hot 100 chart of February 21, 2009, at number 94. The song eventually peaked at number 26 on the chart and becoming his 4th top 40 song in the country.

Charts

Original version

Single remix

Year-end charts

References

2009 singles
Jesse McCartney songs
Ludacris songs
Songs written by Sean Garrett
Hollywood Records singles
2008 songs
Music videos directed by Rich Lee